= Taste confusion matrix =

Scientific test of taste perception

Taste Confusion Matrix (TCM) is a method in which many compounds are tested at the same time. It is a study of human taste perception. It characterizes the quality of taste with identification patterns of some 10 stimuli which are analyzed.
